John Allen Hendricks is a professor whose research focuses on political communication, social media/new media technologies, and the broadcasting industry and is the author of more than ten books on the subjects. He has served as academic department chair since 2009.

His book, Communicator-in-Chief: How Barack Obama Used New Media Technology to Win the White House (co-edited with Robert E. Denton Jr. of Virginia Tech), was one of the first scholarly examinations of the historical role new media technologies played in the historic 2008 American presidential election, and it received the National Communication Association’s Applied Research Division's 2011 Distinguished Edited Book Award. Communicator-in-Chief examined the Obama campaign's innovative uses of social media/new media technologies including Twitter, smartphones, blogging, YouTube and viral videos, and campaign advertisements strategically placed in video games to reach Millennial voters.

Further examining the 2008 presidential campaign, he also co-edited the book Techno Politics in Presidential Campaigning: New Voices, New Technologies, and New Voters (with Lynda Lee Kaid, University of Florida).
  
After the 2012 presidential election, Hendricks' book Presidential Campaigning and Social Media: An Analysis of the 2012 Election (co-edited with Dan Schill of James Madison University) examines the rapidly growing influence of social media in American politics. This was one of the first scholarly monographs to explore the role of social media in the 2012 campaign. It provides analysis on the use of Facebook, Twitter, YouTube, Tumblr, Google+, Instagram, and Pinterest by the presidential candidates.

The 2014 mid-term elections served as another opportunity to study the use of social media in American political campaigning, and Hendricks and Schill published Communication and Mid-Term Elections: Media, Message, and Mobilization. The book examines the campaign issues, media coverage, late-night comedy shows, technology, and advertising strategies in that year's mid-term election.

Following the tumultuous 2016 election, Hendricks' book (co-edited with Dan Schill of James Madison University), The Presidency and Social Media: Discourse, Disruption, and Digital Democracy in the 2016 Presidential Election, examines the important role social media, especially Twitter and Facebook, played in the election and primary campaign.

He has been called upon by American media outlets such as NBC News, FOX News (Sinclair Broadcast Group), and CQ Researcher to discuss the role of social media/new media technologies in the political process.

Hendricks served as president of the Broadcast Education Association (BEA) from 2015 to 2016.

Selected bibliography

Political Communication Books 
 Schill, D. & Hendricks, J. A. (Eds.), The Presidency and Social Media: Discourse, Disruption, and Digital Democracy in the 2016 Presidential Election. (Routledge, 2018). 
 Hendricks, J. A. & Schill, D. (Eds.), Communication and Midterm Elections: Media, Message, and Mobilization. (Palgrave, 2016). 
 Hendricks, J. A. & Schill, D. (Eds.), Presidential Campaigning and Social Media: An Analysis of the 2012 Election. (Oxford, 2015). 
 Hendricks, J. A. & Kaid, L. L. (Eds.), Techno Politics in Presidential Campaigning: New Voices, New Technologies and New Voters. (Routledge, 2011). 
 Hendricks, J. A. & Denton, R. E. Jr. (Eds.), Communicator-in-Chief: How Barack Obama Used New Media Technology to Win the White House. (Lexington, 2010).

Social Media Books 
 Noor Al-Deen, H., & Hendricks, J. A. (Eds.). Social Media and Strategic Communications. (Palgrave, 2013). 
 Noor-Al Deen, H., & Hendricks, J. A. (Eds.). Social Media: Usage and Impact. (Lexington, 2011).

Broadcasting Industry Books  
Hendricks, J.A. (Ed.). Radio's Second Century: Past, Present, and Future Perspectives. (Rutgers University Press, 2020). 
 Hendricks, J. A., & Mims, B. The Radio Station: Broadcasting, Podcasting, and Streaming. (Routledge, 2018). 
 Hendricks, J. A., & Mims, B. Keith’s Radio Station: Broadcast, Satellite, and Internet. (Focal Press, 2015).   
 Hendricks, J. A. (Ed.). The Palgrave Handbook of Global Radio. (Palgrave, 2012).   
 Hendricks, J. A. (Ed.). The Twenty-First-Century Media Industry: Economic and Managerial Implications in the Age of New Media. (Lexington, 2010).

References 

Living people
Stephen F. Austin State University faculty
American mass media scholars
American political writers
University of Southern Mississippi alumni
Southern Arkansas University alumni
University of Arkansas at Little Rock alumni
1970 births